The 1938 Major League Baseball All-Star Game was the sixth playing of the mid-summer classic between the all-stars of the American League (AL) and National League (NL), the two leagues comprising Major League Baseball. The game was held on July 6, 1938, at Crosley Field in Cincinnati, Ohio, the home of the Cincinnati Reds of the National League. The game resulted in the National League defeating the American League 4–1.

Rosters
Players in italics have since been inducted into the National Baseball Hall of Fame.

American League

National League

Game

Umpires

Starting lineups

Game summary

References

External links
Baseball Almanac
Baseball-Reference

Major League Baseball All-Star Game
Major League Baseball All-Star Game
Baseball competitions in Cincinnati
Major League Baseball All Star Game
July 1938 sports events
1930s in Cincinnati